Aliante is used to refer to several items including:

Aliante, North Las Vegas, an upscale master-planned community in North Las Vegas, Nevada
Aliante Casino and Hotel
9426 Aliante